Gerardo Pablo Ameli (born 18 September 1970) is an Argentine football manager, currently in charge of Chilean club Unión La Calera.

Personal life
Ameli's brother Horacio and son Ignacio were both footballers and defenders. His son was also his assistant at Cienciano and La Calera.

References

1976 births
Living people
Sportspeople from Rosario, Santa Fe
Argentine football managers
Sport Rosario managers
Deportivo Municipal managers
Deportes Antofagasta managers
Universidad Técnica de Cajamarca managers
Ayacucho FC managers
Cienciano managers
Unión La Calera managers
Chilean Primera División managers
Argentine expatriate football managers
Argentine expatriate sportspeople in Peru
Argentine expatriate sportspeople in Chile
Expatriate football managers in Peru
Expatriate football managers in Chile